The 1941 season of the Venezuelan Primera División, the top category of Venezuelan football, was played by 6 teams. The national champions were Litoral.

Results

Standings

External links
Venezuela 1941 season at RSSSF

Ven
Venezuelan Primera División seasons
1941 in Venezuelan sport